The 10th Biathlon European Championships were held in Forni Avoltri, Italy, from February 26 to March 2, 2003.

There were total of 16 competitions held: sprint, pursuit, individual and relay both for U26 and U21.

Results

U26

Men's

Women's

U21

Men's

Women's

Medal table

External links 
 IBU full results
 All results

Biathlon European Championships
International sports competitions hosted by Italy
2003 in biathlon
2003 in Italian sport
Biathlon competitions in Italy